Rauf Mehdiyev (born 17 October 1976) is a retired Azerbaijani football goalkeeper whose last club was Neftchi Baku.

During his career, Mehdiyev played for nine different Azerbaijani teams and represented Azerbaijan five times.

Career statistics

Club

International

References

External links
 

1976 births
Azerbaijani footballers
Azerbaijan international footballers
FK Shamkir players
Qarabağ FK players
FC Baku players
AZAL PFK players
Living people
Footballers from Baku
Association football goalkeepers